WTX can refer to:
 WTX (form factor)
 Another name for the gene FAM123B
 WTX101, a bis-choline tetrathiomolybdate de-coppering therapy 

pl:WTX
ru:WTX